Reginald George Neal (1914 – unknown) was an English professional footballer. After being on the books of hometown club Blackpool, he went on to play for Liverpool and Southport, all without making a first-team appearance. He finally made his Football League debut with Bristol City in the 1936–37 season. The following season he joined Gillingham and made a further fourteen League appearances, scoring two goals. There is no record of him playing after the Second World War.

References

1914 births
English footballers
Gillingham F.C. players
Bristol City F.C. players
Blackpool F.C. players
Liverpool F.C. players
Sportspeople from Blackpool
Year of death missing
Association footballers not categorized by position